During the 1999–2000 season, Borussia Dortmund played in the Bundesliga, the highest tier of the German football league system.

Season summary
Michael Skibbe was demoted from his role of head coach in early February after a run of only one win in the last 10 matches, returning to his  previous role as coordinator of the youth team. Bernd Krauss came as his replacement, but only lasted 2 months before being sacked himself with Dortmund one point clear of relegation with five games left. Udo Lattek, who had managed Dortmund nearly two decades earlier, came in for the final five games and saved Dortmund with 8 points in those remaining games, with only one loss (to champions Bayern Munich). Ultimately, Dortmund finished 11th, five points clear of relegation. Lattek returned to retirement at the end of the season (he would never manage another team again) and was succeeded by former Dortmund defender Matthias Sammer.

Players

First team squad
Squad at end of season

Competitions

Bundesliga

League table

References

Notes

Borussia Dortmund seasons
Borussia Dortmund